Fulk (1164 - 26 October 1229) was an Italian Catholic prelate who served as the Bishop of Piacenza from 1210 until 1217 and later as the Bishop of Pavia from 1217 until his death. He served in various capacities prior to his episcopal appointment such as a canon and provost. He was known for making the effort of keeping out of political affairs since he wanted to dedicate himself more to diocesan affairs. He was not consecrated as a bishop while in Piacenza until 1216 and some months after was transferred to Pavia where he would remain until his death.

Life
Fulk was born in Piacenza in 1164 to Scottish parents who had Irish origins; he was also known as Folco Scotti with that surname being given during those times to Irish people who emigrated to the Italian mainland. In 1184 he entered the Canons Regular of Sant'Eufemia before he did theological studies in Paris at the college there after having been sent there around 1185 (though he did first do his studies in Piacenza). In or near 1194 he became the prior for Sant'Eufemia.

Fulk for a brief period taught theological studies to students in Piacenza. He was appointed as a canon in Piacenza and after his studies in Paris became the archpriest for Piacenza. He later was appointed as the Bishop of Piacenza on 2 August 1210 but Pope Honorius III later transferred him to Pavia diocese which he managed until his death. His selection for the Piacenza see received approval from the papal legate and Bishop of Novara Gherardo da Sessia who ensured that Pope Innocent III confirmed the selection. The pope himself conferred episcopal consecration upon him in 1216 just before transferring him to Pavia.

It has been alleged in some sources that Fulk attended the Fourth Council of the Lateran in 1215. Fulk died on 26 October 1229 in Pavia and after his death Pope Gregory IX canonized him as a saint during his pontificate; his remains were transferred from the old to new cathedral in 1567.

Notes and references

External links
 St. Patrick Catholic Church 

1164 births
1229 deaths
13th-century venerated Christians
Bishops of Pavia
Bishops of Piacenza
Italian people of Scottish descent
University of Paris alumni
Venerated Catholics
Italian expatriates in France